Ng Hong-mun GBM (born 9 April 1926) is a Chinese politician who served as a member of the 4th, 5th, 6th, 7th and 8th National People's Congress representing Guangdong, from 1975 to 1998. Ng then served as a member of the 9th and 10th National People's Congress representing Hong Kong, from 1998 to 2008. He is the longest serving member of the National People's Congress from Hong Kong, serving as member for over 32 years. In addition, Ng is also appointed as a Hong Kong affair advisor in 1992 and as a member of the Preliminary Working Committee in 1993. 

Ng was awarded the Grand Bauhinia Medal, the highest award under the Hong Kong honours and awards system by Chief Executive CH Tung on July 1 1998. He currently works as a columnist for Ming Pao.

Awards
1998: Grand Bauhinia Medal

Controversial Remarks

Criticizing the Pro-Democracy Camp
On 8 March 2014, Ng, as a columnist for Ming Pao, commented that the recent political chaos in Hong Kong has reached a "critical point". He denounced the Occupy Central with Love and Peace movement launched by members of the pro-democracy camp, warning that further moves against the Chinese Government by the general public will result in a "total disaster" for Hong Kong, causing Hong Kong to be totally ungovernable.

References

1926 births
Living people
Recipients of the Grand Bauhinia Medal
Members of the Preparatory Committee for the Hong Kong Special Administrative Region
Hong Kong Affairs Advisors
Delegates to the 10th National People's Congress from Hong Kong
Members of the Selection Committee of Hong Kong
1967 Hong Kong riots